Adoni Maropis  (born July 20, 1963) is a Greek-American actor.

Maropis was born in Pittsburgh, Pennsylvania, the middle of three sons. He is best known for playing Quan Chi in Mortal Kombat: Conquest. He also played General Hassan in Command & Conquer: Tiberian Sun as well as Sakr in Hidalgo. He appeared in a recurring role as terrorist leader Abu Fayed in season six of 24 and as an assassin in the season three premiere of the television series Chuck.

Maropis is also a table tennis player, preferring the "orthodox styles" of hardbat and sandpaper table tennis.  he holds titles as world and US champion for sandpaper table tennis and also won the hardbat class of the US championship in 2011.  Maropis is currently working on a feature film project entitled "The Last Palikari" written by himself and his father, Petro Maropis.  A short version of the project was completed in 2012 with Vertex Media in Los Angeles, CA.

Filmography

References

External links

Official website

1963 births
Male actors from Pittsburgh
American male film actors
American male television actors
American male table tennis players
Living people
American people of Greek descent